Gisella Anastasia (born November 16, 1990), also known as Gisel Idol is a Singer who is the runner-up of the television show Indonesian Idol (season 5).

Personal life 
On September 14, 2013, Gisella married Gading Marten, son of actor Roy Marten, with a blessing ceremony held in Uluwatu, Bali. They divorced in January 2019.

Education 
Petra 1 Christian Senior High School Surabaya (2004)
Bunda Mulia University (2006)

Appearance at Indonesian Idol

Discography

Singles 
 Seluruh Nafas Ini feat. Last Child (band) (2011)
 Pencuri Hati (2012)
 Cara Melupakanmu (2016)
 Hidup Untukmu feat. Rayen Pono (2017)
 Indah Pada Waktunya (2018)
 Sendirian feat. Abirama (2018)
 Yang Kumau (2019) (Ost. Rumput Tetangga)
 Katakanlah feat. Coboy (2019)
 Masih Bisa Panjang feat. Young Lex (2020)

Films

FTV 
 Cinta Bersemi demi Harta Warisan
 Jadikan Aku Pacarmu
 Cinta Tak Selancar Berselancar
 Malu-Malu Mau
 My Gebetan Wedding
 My Gebetan Wedding 2
 Mantanku Mirip Gisel
 Keren Keren Mellow
 Cicilan Cinta Tukang Kredit (2018) sebagai Cinta

TV Shows 
 Opera Van Java (2021)

Advertisement 
 Samsung Galaxy J1
 We Chat
 Caplang Minyak Kayu Putih
 Sprei Lady Rose

Nominated and award

Controversies
On Nov 6, 2020 circulated exciting 19 seconds in duration featuring a woman who looked like actress Gisella Anastasia having sex with a man then later became a 'trending topic on Twitter Indonesia until Saturday Nov 7, 2020.

Initially, many netizens thought that the male lead in the video was Adhietya Mukti, the keyboardist of a band called The Rhythm Band which is a band that accompanies Indonesian singers such as Ayu Ting Ting, Zaskia Gotik, and even the actress who is suspected of playing the female role in the is Gisella Anastasia.

Adhietya himself has denied the accusation by saying that it is an unfounded slander, even Adhietya even went as far as to clarify the opinion of netizens about the physical appearance of the male actor in the mole on his right cheek， he also compares the male lead in 's body posture with his，where the actor's posture tends to be more of a skinny body with a slimmer face.

References

External links 
 

Batak people
Indonesian people of Chinese descent
Living people
1990 births
People from Surabaya